Denis Jachiet (born 21 April 1962) is a French Catholic prelate who is currently Bishop of Belfort-Montbéliard. He served as Auxiliary Bishop of Paris from June 2016 to October 2021 and as Titular Bishop of Tigisis (a former bishopric that is now in rural Algeria).

Biography
Denis Jachiet graduated from the Ecole Nationale Superieure de Chimie in Paris and holds a PhD in organic chemistry from the Paris VI University. He attended the seminar in Paris in 1990. He followed the first cycle of the seminary at the cathedral school in paris and completed his training at the Institute of Theological Studies in Brussels where he obtained a bachelor's degree in Theology.  He was ordained priest for the diocese of Paris on 29 June 1996.

After obtaining his license, he was appointed vicar of Notre-Dame-de-Grâce-de-Passy and chaplain of the college and high school students of Saint-Jean de Passy.

From 2000, he devoted himself to the training of seminarians.  From 2000 to 2014, he taught at the Cathedral School.  He is also in charge of the Maison Saint-Roch of the seminary until 2010. From 2002 until 2009, he is also a delegate for priestly and religious vocations.  From 2009 to 2010 he is also director of Maison Saint-Augustin where the year of propédeutique for the diocese of Paris takes place.

He returned to parish responsibilities in 2010 when he was appointed parish priest of Saint-Séverin-Saint-Nicolas and head of the Maison Saint-Séverin of the seminary.  In 2013 he was appointed as a diocesan chaplain of the unitary scouts of France.

In 2014, Cardinal André Vingt-Trois appointed him titular canon of the cathedral of Paris and vicar general in charge of the east and south-east of the diocese.

On 25 June 2016 Pope Francis appointed Auxiliary Bishop of Paris at the same time as Thibault Verny.  It assigns to him the titular seat of Tigisis in Numidia (near present-day Aïn el-Bordj, Algeria).  Their episcopal ordination took place on 9 September following.

On 2 October 2021, he was appointed as Bishop of Belfort-Montbéliard.

References

1962 births
Living people
21st-century Roman Catholic titular bishops
21st-century Roman Catholic bishops in France